The Jamul Indian Village of California is a federally recognized tribe of Kumeyaay Indians, who are sometimes known as Mission Indians.

Reservation

It was established in 1912. No one lives on the reservation although 20 members lived there in the 1970s.

Language
The traditional language of the Jamul Indian Village and their larger tribal group, the Kumeyaay, is from the Tipai language grouping. The influence of the Spanish Mission system on the retention of the Jamul Indian Village native tongue can be observed as there are only a small amount of less than 100 tribal members who retain their native language. The Jamul Indian Village as well uses English in modern times as a primary language for communication.

Government
The Jamul Indian Village is headquartered in Jamul, California. The current government for the Jamul Indian Village is a democratically elected tribal council. As of June 2017 Jamul Tribal Council consist of

 Erica M. Pinto, Chairwoman
 Mike Hunter, Vice-Chairman
 Richard Tellow, Treasurer
 Christopher Pinto, Councilman
 James Cuero III, Councilman
 Teresa Cousins, Councilwoman
 Carlene A. Chamberlain, Tribal Secretary/Enrollment Coordinator
 Jesse Pinto Sr., Councilman

History
Starting 12,000 years ago the tribal members of the Jamul Indian Village planted their roots. The tribe studied and understood their environment and tried their best in tradition and practice to honor the land they were blessed with calling their home. They used to practice basket weaving and traditional hunting and other games. They would perform cultural burnings and use the land in equilibrium with what it provided. The European contact caused a stir with the tribe as they had lost a large portion of their traditions to the forced assimilation brought upon their tribe. However many generations later many of their traditions have been revived and practiced and now there is a large group of tribal members honoring their ancestors. The tribe in 2016 opened the Hollywood Casino Jamul and now it provides a large source of income through their newly built casino. San Diego government officials still grapple with the impact of the controversial casino onto the local community.

Education
The village is served by the Jamul-Dulzura Union Elementary School District and Grossmont Union High School District.

Bibliography

References

External links
 Jamul Indian Village, official website

Kumeyaay
California Mission Indians
Native American tribes in San Diego County, California
Native American tribes in California
Federally recognized tribes in the United States
American Indian reservations in California
East County (San Diego County)